The 1778 Vermont Republic gubernatorial election took place on March 12, 1778, and resulted in the selection of Thomas Chittenden as the republic's first governor. This was Vermont's first gubernatorial election after declaring independence in 1777.

After declaring themselves independent, the former New Hampshire Grants were first known as New Connecticut, but soon changed their name to Vermont. In early 1778, the council of safety that temporarily governed the new republic invited each Vermont town to elect two delegates to meet at a convention in Windsor.

The delegates assembled on March 12 and organized themselves into the first Vermont House of Representatives. They then proceeded to the election of a governor, lieutenant governor, treasurer, and members of a governor's council, who would serve until elections could be held in October. Thomas Chittenden, who had served as president of the council of safety, was chosen for governor. Joseph Marsh was elected lieutenant governor, and Ira Allen was the convention's choice for treasurer. The names of candidates and balloting totals were not recorded, but the convention's secretary noted that Chittenden was elected "by a great majority of votes."

On October 8, 1778, the Vermont General Assembly met in Windsor. Members of the House of Representatives voted for governor, lieutenant governor, treasurer, and members of the governor's council. Chittenden, Marsh, and Allen were elected to one-year terms, though the recorder did not report the vote totals.

Results

References

Vermont gubernatorial elections
1778 in Vermont
1778 elections in North America